Georgy Baimakov (born 1 June 1894, date of death unknown) was a Russian swimmer. He competed in the men's 200 metre breaststroke and men's 400 metre breaststroke events at the 1912 Summer Olympics.

References

External links
 

1894 births
Year of death missing
Male swimmers from the Russian Empire
Male breaststroke swimmers
Olympic competitors for the Russian Empire
Swimmers at the 1912 Summer Olympics
Swimmers from Saint Petersburg